Operation Alula Aba Nega, commonly shortened to Operation Alula, was a counter-offensive during the Tigray War by the Tigray Defense Forces against the Ethiopian military and its allies in Tigray. The operation was named after Ethiopian general Ras Alula Aba Nega, who was of Tigrayan descent. The offensive was launched on 18 June 2021 and recaptured vast swaths of territory across central and eastern Tigray, including the regional capital of Mekelle.

Timeline 
On 23 June, the Tigray Defense Forces (TDF) shot down an Ethiopian Air Force Lockheed C-130 Hercules cargo plane.

On 28 June, the TDF took control of the regional capital of Mekelle after forcing ENDF troops to retreat.

On 29 June, Eritrean soldiers withdrew from Shire, Axum and Adwa, allowing TDF forces to move in.

References

2021 in Ethiopia
2021 in international relations
July 2021 events in Africa
June 2021 events in Africa
Tigray War
O